Harmonizers may refer to:
Harmonizer, a type of pitch shifter
Alexandria Harmonizers, a choir from Alexandria, Virginia, United States
The Four Harmonizers, a barbershop quartet from Chicago, Illinois, United States
Homestead Harmonizers, a barbershop choir from Beatrice, Nebraska, United States
Imperial Golden Crown Harmonizers, a gospel band based in Texas, United States
The Spiritual Harmonizers, a gospel group from Richmond, Virginia, United States
Harmonizers, a nickname for fans of Fifth Harmony, an American girl group; see List of fandom names
Harmonize (musician)
Harmonizer (Apoptygma Berzerk album), 2002
Harmonizer (Ty Segall album), 2021
I'll Sing You a Song and Harmonize Too

See also
Harmonic (disambiguation)
Harmony (disambiguation)